The Women's 10 km competition of the 2020 European Aquatics Championships was held on 13 May 2021.

Results
The race was held at 10:00.

References

Women's 10 km